Darreh Vazam (also Romanized as Darreh Vezem and Darreh Vezm; also known as Takrūzom and Taqrūzūm) is a village in Bavaleh Rural District, in the Central District of Sonqor County, Kermanshah Province, Iran. At the 2006 census, its population was 112, in 18 families.

References 

Populated places in Sonqor County